The Not-A-Pe-Ka-Gon Site or Notipekago Site, also known as the Quick Site, is a multi-component archaeological site located near where South Custer Road crosses the Pere Marquette River in Mason County, Michigan.  It was designated a Michigan State Historic Site in 1993 and listed on the National Register of Historic Places in 1973.

History
The oral tradition of the Odawa people holds that the Not-A-Pe-Ka-Gon Site was the site of an important 17th century battle between the Odawa and Mascouten peoples.  Many men from both sides of the conflict died in the battle, and their skulls were placed on sticks along the riverbank; the site became known as "Notipekago" or "Notipekagon" - literally, "heads on sticks."

Years later, erosion exposed the previously buried remains of the warriors, leading to the modern archaeological discovery of the site.

Description
The Not-A-Pe-Ka-Gon Site is located on two river terraces along the Pere Marquette River.  The site contains three small mounds, and pottery and French trade goods were found.

References

Further reading

Archaeological sites on the National Register of Historic Places in Michigan
Buildings and structures in Mason County, Michigan
National Register of Historic Places in Mason County, Michigan